Stenaspidiotus is an extinct genus of leaf beetle in the subfamily Chrysomelinae. It contains a single species, Stenaspidiotus microptilus. It was erected in 2013 by George Poinar Jr.

Discovery
The type specimen was located in a fragment of amber from the Cordillera Septentrional in the Dominican Republic. The amber dates from between  15–20 to 30–45 million years ago.

Description
The adult beetle preserved in amber is 10.2 mm in length with a metallic brown-black colouration.

References

†
†
Beetles described in 2013
Prehistoric beetle genera
Taxa named by George Poinar Jr.